A nuclear close call is an incident that might have led to at least one unintended nuclear detonation or explosion, but did not. These incidents typically involve a perceived imminent threat to a nuclear-armed country which could lead to retaliatory strikes against the perceived aggressor. The damage caused by international nuclear exchange is not necessarily limited to the participating countries, as the hypothesized rapid climate change associated with even small-scale regional nuclear war could threaten food production worldwide—a scenario known as nuclear famine.

Despite a reduction in global nuclear tensions and major nuclear arms reductions after the end of the Cold War (in 1992), estimated nuclear warhead stockpiles total roughly 15,000 worldwide, with the United States and Russia holding 90% of the total.

Though exact details on many nuclear close calls are hard to come by, the analysis of particular cases has highlighted the importance of a variety of factors in preventing accidents. At an international level, this includes the importance of context and outside mediation; at the national level, effectiveness in government communications, and involvement of key decision-makers; and, at the individual level, the decisive role of individuals in following intuition and prudent decision-making, often in violation of protocol.

1950s

5 November 1956 

During the Suez Crisis, the North American Aerospace Defense Command (NORAD) received a number of simultaneous reports, including unidentified aircraft over Turkey, Soviet MiG-15 fighters over Syria, a downed British Canberra medium bomber, and unexpected maneuvers by the Soviet Black Sea Fleet through the Dardanelles that appeared to signal a Soviet offensive. Considering previous Soviet threats to use conventional missiles against France and the United Kingdom, U.S. forces believed these events could trigger a NATO nuclear strike against the Soviet Union. In fact, all reports of Soviet action turned out to be erroneous, misinterpreted, or exaggerated. The perceived threat was due to a coincidental combination of events, including a wedge of swans over Turkey, a fighter escort for Syrian President Shukri al-Quwatli returning from Moscow, a British bomber brought down by mechanical issues, and scheduled exercises of the Soviet fleet.

Late 1958
U.S. Secretary of State Christian Herter characterized the Second Taiwan Strait Crisis as "the first serious nuclear crisis". In this conflict, the PRC shelled the islands of Kinmen (Quemoy) and the Matsu Islands along the east coast of mainland China (in the Taiwan Strait) to "liberate" Taiwan from the Chinese Nationalist Party, also known as the Kuomintang (KMT); and to probe the extent of the United States defense of Taiwan's territory. A naval battle also took place around Dongding Island when the ROC Navy repelled an attempted amphibious landing by the PRC Navy.

1960s

5 October 1960 
Radar equipment in Thule, Greenland, mistakenly interpreted a moonrise over Norway as a large-scale Soviet missile launch. Upon receiving a report of the supposed attack, NORAD went on high alert. However, doubts about the authenticity of the attack arose due to the presence of Soviet leader Nikita Khrushchev in New York City as head of the USSR's United Nations delegation.

24 January 1961 

On 24 January 1961, a B-52 Stratofortress carrying two 3–4-megaton Mark 39 nuclear bombs broke up in mid-air near Goldsboro, North Carolina, dropping its nuclear payload in the process. Five crewmen successfully ejected or bailed out of the aircraft and landed safely, another ejected but did not survive the landing, and two died in the crash. 

Information declassified in 2013 showed that "only a single switch prevented the ... bomb from detonating and spreading fire and destruction over a wide area." An expert evaluation written on 22 October 1969 by Parker F. Jones, the supervisor of the nuclear weapons safety department at Sandia National Laboratories, reported that "one simple, dynamo-technology, low voltage switch stood between the United States and a major catastrophe", and that it "seems credible" that a short circuit in the Arm line during a mid-air breakup of the aircraft "could" have resulted in a nuclear explosion.

24 November 1961 

Staff at the Strategic Air Command Headquarters (SAC HQ) simultaneously lost contact with NORAD and multiple Ballistic Missile Early Warning System sites. Since these communication lines were designed to be redundant and independent from one another, the communications failure was interpreted as either a very unlikely coincidence or a coordinated attack. SAC HQ prepared the entire ready force for takeoff before already-overhead aircraft confirmed that there did not appear to be an attack. It was later found that the failure of a single relay station in Colorado was the sole cause of the communications problem.

25 October 1962 

During the Cuban Missile Crisis, US military planners expected that sabotage operations might precede any nuclear first strike by the Soviet Union. Around midnight on 25 October 1962, a guard at the Duluth Sector Direction Center saw a figure climbing the security fence. He shot at it and activated the sabotage alarm, which automatically set off similar alarms at other bases in the region. At Volk Field in Wisconsin, a faulty alarm system caused the Klaxon to sound instead, which ordered Air Defense Command (ADC) nuclear-armed F-106A interceptors into the air. The pilots had been told there would be no practice alert drills and, according to political scientist Scott D. Sagan, "fully believed that a nuclear war was starting". Before the planes were able to take off, the base commander contacted Duluth and learned of the error. An officer in the command center drove his car onto the runway, flashing his lights and signaling to the aircraft to stop. The intruder was discovered to be a bear.
 
Sagan writes that the incident raised the dangerous possibility of an ADC interceptor accidentally shooting down a Strategic Air Command (SAC) bomber. Interceptor crews had not been given full information by SAC of plans to move bombers to dispersal bases (such as Volk Field) or the classified routes flown by bombers on continuous alert as part of Operation Chrome Dome. Declassified ADC documents later revealed that "the incident led to changes in the alert Klaxon system [...] to prevent a recurrence".

27 October 1962 

At the height of the Cuban Missile Crisis, Soviet patrol submarine  almost launched a nuclear-armed torpedo while under harassment by American naval forces. One of several vessels surrounded by American destroyers near Cuba, B-59 dove to avoid detection and was unable to communicate with Moscow for a number of days.  began dropping practice depth charges to signal B-59 to surface; however the captain of the Soviet submarine and its zampolit took these to be real depth charges. With low batteries affecting the submarine's life support systems and unable to make contact with Moscow, the commander of B-59 feared that war had already begun and ordered the use of a 10-kiloton nuclear torpedo against the American fleet. The zampolit agreed, but the chief of staff of the flotilla (second in command of the flotilla) Vasily Arkhipov refused permission to launch. He convinced the captain to calm down, surface, and make contact with Moscow for new orders.

On the same day, an American U-2 spy plane was shot down over Cuba, and another U-2 flown by United States Air Force Captain Charles Maultsby from Eielson Air Force Base, Alaska, strayed  into Soviet airspace. Despite orders to avoid Soviet airspace by at least , a navigational error caused by the aurora borealis took the U-2 over the Chukotka Peninsula, causing Soviet MiG interceptors to scramble and pursue the aircraft. American F-102A interceptors armed with GAR-11 Falcon nuclear air-to-air missiles (each with a 0.25 kiloton yield) were then scrambled to escort the U-2 into friendly airspace. Individual pilots were capable of arming and launching their missiles. The incident remained secret for many years.

28 October 1962
Before dawn a mistaken order was issued by Kadena Air Base in Okinawa to nuclear missile sites in Okinawa to launch all their nuclear missiles. None was launched. A team responsible for four missiles at Bolo Airfield in Yomitan reported that the order's codes were in order, but the local officer in charge did not trust the order, partly because only one of their four missiles was targeted on Russia, and he saw no logic why missiles would be launched against China too, and because readiness was at DEFCON 2, not DEFCON 1.

9 November 1965 

The Command Center of the Office of Emergency Planning went on full alert after a massive power outage in the northeastern United States. Several nuclear bomb detectors—used to distinguish between regular power outages and power outages caused by a nuclear blast—near major U.S. cities malfunctioned due to circuit errors, creating the illusion of a nuclear attack.

23 May 1967 

A powerful solar flare accompanied by a coronal mass ejection interfered with multiple NORAD radars over the Northern Hemisphere. This interference was initially interpreted as intentional jamming of the radars by the Soviets, thus an act of war. A nuclear bomber counter-strike was nearly launched by the United States.

15 April 1969 

After the 1969 EC-121 shootdown incident, F-4 Phantom fighter jets at Kunsan Air Base were ordered to load B61 nuclear bombs and began planning and preparations for a nuclear strike against the Democratic People's Republic of Korea (North Korea). After a few hours, the order to stand down was given. The jet never took off. Reportedly, President Richard Nixon was drunk when he gave the order for a nuclear attack against the DPRK. The order to stand down was given on the advice of Secretary of State Henry Kissinger.

1970s

October 1973 

During the Yom Kippur War, Israeli officials panicked that the Arab invasion force would overrun Israel after the Syrian Army nearly achieved a breakout in the Golan Heights, and the U.S. government rebuffed Israel's request for an emergency airlift. According to a former CIA official, General Moshe Dayan requested and received authorization from Israeli Prime Minister Golda Meir to arm 13 Jericho missiles and 8 F-4 Phantom II fighter jets with nuclear warheads. The missile launchers were located at Sdot Micha Airbase, while the fighter jets were placed on 24-hour notice at Tel Nof Airbase. The missiles were said to be aimed at the Arab military headquarters in Cairo and Damascus.

The United States discovered Israel's nuclear deployment after a Lockheed SR-71 Blackbird reconnaissance aircraft spotted the missiles, and it began an airlift the same day. After the U.N. Security Council imposed a ceasefire, conflict resumed when the Israel Defense Force moved to encircle the Egyptian Third Army. According to former U.S. State Department officials, General Secretary Leonid Brezhnev threatened to deploy the Soviet Airborne Forces against Israeli forces, and the U.S. Armed Forces were placed at DEFCON 3. Israel also redeployed its nuclear weapons. While DEFCON 3 was still in effect, mechanics repairing the alarm system at Kincheloe Air Force Base in Michigan accidentally activated it and nearly scrambled the B-52 bombers at the base before the duty officer declared a false alarm. The crisis finally ended when Prime Minister Meir halted all military action. Declassified Israeli documents have not confirmed these allegations directly, but have confirmed that Israel was willing to use "drastic means" to win the war.

9 November 1979 

Computer errors at the NORAD headquarters in Peterson Air Force Base, the Strategic Air Command command post in Offutt Air Force Base, the National Military Command Center in the Pentagon, and the Alternate National Military Command Center in the Raven Rock Mountain Complex led to alarm and full preparation for a nonexistent large-scale Soviet attack. NORAD notified national security adviser Zbigniew Brzezinski that the Soviet Union had launched 250 ballistic missiles with a trajectory for the United States, stating that a decision to retaliate would need to be made by the president within 3 to 7 minutes. NORAD computers then placed the number of incoming missiles at 2,200. Strategic Air Command was notified, and nuclear bombers prepared for takeoff. Within six to seven minutes of the initial response, PAVE PAWS satellite and radar systems were able to confirm that the attack was a false alarm. 

Congress quickly learned of the incident because Senator Charles H. Percy was present at the NORAD headquarters during the panic. A General Accounting Office investigation found that a training scenario was inadvertently loaded into an operational computer in the Cheyenne Mountain Complex. Commenting on the incident, U.S. State Department adviser Marshall Shulman stated that "false alerts of this kind are not a rare occurrence. There is a complacency about handling them that disturbs me." Soviet General Secretary Leonid Brezhnev composed a letter to U.S. President Jimmy Carter that the false alarm was "fraught with a tremendous danger" and "I think you will agree with me that there should be no errors in such matters." In the months following the incident there were three more false alarms at NORAD, two of them caused by faulty computer chips. One of them forced the National Emergency Airborne Command Post to taxi into position at Andrews Air Force Base.

1980s

15 March 1980 

A Soviet submarine near the Kuril Islands launched four missiles as part of a training exercise. Of these four, American early warning sensors suggested one to be aimed towards the United States. In response, the United States convened officials for a threat assessment conference, at which point it was determined to not be a threat and the situation was resolved.

26 September 1983 

Several weeks after the downing of Korean Air Lines Flight 007 over Soviet airspace, a satellite early-warning system near Moscow reported the launch of one American Minuteman ICBM. Soon after, it reported that five missiles had been launched. Convinced that a real American offensive would involve many more missiles, Lieutenant Colonel Stanislav Petrov of the Air Defense Forces refused to acknowledge the threat as legitimate and continued to convince his superiors that it was a false alarm until this could be confirmed by ground radar.

7 to 11 November 1983 

Able Archer 83 was a command post exercise carried out by NATO military forces and political leaders between 7 and 11 November 1983. The exercise simulated a Soviet conventional attack on European NATO forces 3 days before the start of the exercise (D-3), transitioning to a large scale chemical war (D-1) and on day 1 (D+1) of the exercise, NATO forces sought political guidance on the use of nuclear weapons to stem the Soviet advance which was approved by political leaders. NATO then began simulating preparations for a transition to nuclear war.

These simulations included 170 radio-silent flights to air lift 19,000 US troops to Europe, regularly shifting military commands to avoid nuclear attack, the use of new nuclear weapon release procedures, the use of nuclear Command, Control, and Communications (C3) networks for passing nuclear orders, the moving of NATO forces in Europe through each of the alert phases from DEFCON 5 to DEFCON 1, and the participation of political leaders like Margaret Thatcher, Helmut Kohl and Ronald Reagan.

The issue was worsened by leaders referring to B-52 sorties as "nuclear strikes", by the increased use of encrypted diplomatic channels between the US and UK, and by the nuclear attack false alarm in September.

In response, Soviet nuclear capable aircraft were fueled and armed ready to launch on the runway, and ICBMs were brought up to alert. Soviet leaders believed the exercise was a ruse to cover NATO preparations for a nuclear first strike and frantically sent a telegram to its residencies seeking information on NATO preparations for an attack. The exercise closely aligned with Soviet timeline estimations that a NATO first strike would take 7 to 10 days to execute from the political decision being made.

Soviet forces stood down after 11 November when the exercise ended and NATO was not aware of the complete Soviet response until British intelligence asset Oleg Gordievsky passed on the information.

1990s

1991 

During the Persian Gulf War, Ba'athist Iraq launched Scud missiles at Saudi Arabia and Israel and possessed a large cache of weapons of mass destruction. This, along with Saddam Hussein's previous threat to "burn half of Israel" with chemical weapons, led to fears that Saddam Hussein would order the use of the chemical weapons against the U.S.-led coalition or against Israel (see Iraq–Israel relations#Until the 2003 Iraq War). Israeli Prime Minister Yitzhak Shamir and Israeli Air Force Commander-in-Chief Avihu Ben-Nun both warned that an Iraqi chemical attack would trigger "massive retaliation", implying that Israel would retaliate with nuclear weapons. At the same time U.S. Secretary of Defense Dick Cheney, General Norman Schwarzkopf Jr., and British Prime Minister Margaret Thatcher all emphasized that the use of WMD against Coalition forces would lead to a nuclear attack on Iraq. 

U.S. Secretary of State James Baker directly warned his counterpart Tariq Aziz that the United States had "the means to exact vengeance" in the event of an Iraqi resort to WMD. After the war, the Defense Intelligence Agency credited these threats with deterring Iraq from launching chemical attacks on Coalition forces. Nevertheless, Saddam Hussein did have a contingency plan to launch WMD-armed warheads at Tel Aviv in the event that he became cut off from the Iraqi Armed Forces leadership or if the Iraqi government was about to collapse, which almost certainly would have triggered a retaliatory nuclear response from Israel. Saddam ultimately never deemed this option necessary because he never felt as if his government was about to collapse.

25 January 1995 

Russian President Boris Yeltsin became the first world leader to activate the Russian nuclear briefcase after Russian radar systems detected the launch of what was later determined to be a Norwegian Black Brant XII research rocket being used to study the Northern Lights. Russian ballistic missile submarines were put on alert in preparation for a possible retaliatory strike. When it became clear the rocket did not pose a threat to Russia and was not part of a larger attack, the alarm was cancelled. Russia was in fact one of a number of countries earlier informed of the launch; however, the information had not reached the Russian radar operators.

See also 

 Broken Arrow (nuclear)
 Cold War II
 Doomsday Clock
 List of military nuclear accidents
 List of nuclear coercion attempts
 Mutual assured destruction
 Nuclear and radiation accidents and incidents
 Nuclear terrorism
 Nuclear winter
 Sino-Soviet border conflict
 Vulnerability of nuclear plants to attack
 World War III

References

Further reading 

 

Close calls
Close calls
Close calls

Close calls
War scare